Daji (died after 1046 BC) was the favorite consort of King Zhou of Shang, the last king of China's Shang dynasty.

Daji may also refer to:
Daji, Fujian (大济), a town in Xianyou County, Fujian, China
Daji Township, Shandong (大集), a township in Cao County, Shandong, China
Daji Township, Zhejiang (大漈), a township in Jingning She Autonomous County, Zhejiang, China
Daji Subdistrict (大集), a subdistrict in Caidian District, Wuhan, Hubei, China
Daji, Comoros, a village on Anjouan in the Comoros